Troy Vashon Donte Lane (born April 13, 1996), known professionally as UnoTheActivist (also known as The Act) is an American rapper and songwriter from Atlanta, Georgia. He is most well known for his songs, "What," "Giuseppe Swag," and "Parkin' Lot Pimpin". He is also known for his collaborations with fellow Atlanta rappers Thouxanbanfauni and Playboi Carti.

Early life
Lane started rapping in the ninth grade. He released his first single while being a senior in high school. He was also close friends with fellow Atlanta rapper Playboi Carti, leading to speculation that the two were cousins. However, Lane has since confirmed that they are not related.

Career

2015-2016: Beginnings
In 2015, he released a collaborative project with fellow Atlanta rapper Thouxanbanfauni titled For Christ Sake.

2017-present
In May 2017, he released a single with Playboi Carti titled "What," which gained popularity after its video was uploaded on ASAP Rocky's YouTube channel. In June 2017, he released a collaboration with American rapper Famous Dex titled "Hold Up". On September 2017, he released the mixtape Live.Shyne.Die. In January 2019, he appeared on rapper Elias Boussnina's single "Bring the Pain". In February 2019, he released the sequel to his collaborative project with Thouxanbanfauni titled For Christ Sake 2 In January 2021, he released his sophomore LP Unoverse.

In September 2022 he released his next project Limbus 3.

In October 2022 he tweeted on Twitter: ,,That Being Said, That Was My Last Project, Farewell Underground I Quit''.

Discography

Studio albums

Compilation albums

Collaborative albums

Mixtapes

Extended Plays

References

External links 
 

Living people
1996 births
American male rappers
Rappers from Atlanta